The Southwest Region or South-West Region is a region in Cameroon. Its capital is Buea. , its population was 1,553,320. Along with the Northwest Region, it is one of the two Anglophone (English-speaking) regions of Cameroon. Various Ambazonian nationalist and separatist factions regard the Sud-Ouest region as being distinct as a polity from Cameroon.

History
In 1884, the region was colonized by Germany under the Protectorate regime until 1916 when it became a condominium administered jointly by the United Kingdom and the France. In 1919, the administration of the South West region became solely British.
In 1961, the region joined Cameroon.

Ambazonian separatism
At the end of 2017, an Ambazonian separatist movement in the two English-speaking regions of the North-West and South-West initiated a wave of violence affecting the military, police, business leaders and workers. The separatist militiamen are trying in particular to prevent children from returning to school. Between 2016 and 2019, separatists reportedly ransacked, destroyed or burned more than 174 schools Separatists from the Ambazonia administration regard both the Nord-Ouest (Northwest) and Sud-Ouest (Southwest) regions as being constituent components of their envisaged breakaway state.

Administration
The region is divided into six divisions or departments: Fako, Koupé-Manengouba, Lebialem, Manyu, Meme, and Ndian. These are in turn broken down into subdivisions. Presidentially appointed senior divisional officers and subdivisional officers govern each respectively.

Geography
The region was notable for having the first English-speaking university in Cameroon (the University of Buea).
Towns include the capital Buea, Limbe, Tiko, Kumba and Mamfe. Limbe in particular is a popular tourist resort notable for its fine beaches. Korup National Park is also a major attraction. Buea itself, meanwhile, sits at the foot of Mount Cameroon, and possesses an almost temperate climate markedly different from the rest of the province.

Culture
The province is largely Anglophone and Protestant Christian.

Common dishes in the region

Demographics

Healthcare
Limbe Provincial Hospital

References

 
Regions of Cameroon